Paul Andrew Collins (October 31, 1907 – September 25, 1988) was an American football end in the National Football League for the Boston Braves/Redskins. He played college football at Trinity College.

People from Woodbury County, Iowa
Players of American football from Iowa
American football wide receivers
Trinity Bantams football players
Boston Braves (NFL) players
Boston Redskins players
1907 births
1988 deaths